Kolja Schallenberg (born April 1984) is a German director and playwright.

Career 
Born in Hagen, Germany, Kolja studied classical singing at the Musical school in Dortmund. He graduated in cultural and media management from Hochschule für Musik und Theater Hamburg. He studied Theatre Directing at Mountview Academy of Theatre Arts in London, led by Peter James. He also attended courses in adult education at Technische Universität Kaiserslautern. Furthermore, he an attended to the Masterclass in Directing at the Shakespeare's Globe.

From 2002, Kolja has been involved in a number of theatrical productions across Germany as associate director: Konzertdirektion Landgraf, Stage Entertainment Germany, Musiktheater im Revier Gelsenkirchen and Thalia Theater Hamburg, just to mention a few. During this period, he collaborated with some notable personalities such as Günter Grass, Prof. Hermann Schmidt-Rahmer, Euro Voices, Laith Al Deen and many more.

In 2006, Kolja debuted as director with "the Show must go on" at Schauspielhaus Dortmund, followed by "Frühstück bei Goethe" at The Staatstheater, Nürnberg, "Alles muss raus" and "24 Stunden - LebensTräume" at Schauspielhaus Bochum.

For his work, Kolja received multiple invites to festivals and awards: der Literaturwettbewerb Dortmund, das Fringe Festival Hamburg, K15-Festival and was nominated for best director at the IV. international directors festival.

In 2014, he took the role of artistic director and he is co-responsible for the highly regarded spectacular productions shown all over the world on board of AIDA Cruises, the German arm of Carnival Cruises.

Since 2016, he is the artistic director of Transparence Theatre - Transgender on Stage.

Theatre

As Director (Notable works) 
 The Show must go on. Revue. 2006 (with texts by Udo Grashoff; world premiere Theater Dortmund)
 Ein Gespräch im Hause Stein über den abwesenden Herrn von Goethe. 2006 (by Peter Hacks; Theater Dortmund)
 Shark Kiss. 2007 (by Gerhard Meister; German premiere Theater Dortmund)
 Über die Schädlichkeit des Nikotins. 2007 (by Anton P. Tschechow; Theater Dortmund)
 Frühstück bei Goethe. Collage. 2008 (with original texts by Johann Wolfgang von Goethe; Staatstheater Nürnberg)
 Alles muss raus! Lyrik, Prosa, Szenen und Musik aus allen Epochen. 2008 (Staatstheater Nürnberg)
 24 Stunden – Lebensträume. 2009 (world premiere Schauspielhaus Bochum; invited to K15-Festival)
 Die Bakchen. 2009 (by Euripides; Sprechwerk Hamburg; invited to IV. international Directorsfestival
 Der Menschenfeind. (by Molière; Monsuntheater Hamburg) 2009. Reopening in 2012.
 Stücke Schießen. New Writers. New Texts. New Plays. 2009–2011 (Theater Liga Hamburg/Kulturhaus III&70)
 Die Signatur des Pelikans. A Strindberg Project. 2010 (Theater Liga Hamburg/Fleetstreet)
 Meine tolle Scheidung. 2010 (by Geraldine Aron; Theater Liga Hamburg/Galeria Kaufhof Dortmund)
 Samsara - The Circle of Life. 2015 (by Timo Wuerz & Kolja Schallenberg; AIDA Cruises)
 Fernando Montano presents Hollywood Classics. 2017 (by Kolja Schallenberg & Fernando Montano; Hippodrome London)
 Mary Stuart - The Musical. 2017 (by Kolja Schallenberg, music by Paul Glaser; Karamel Klub)

As Writer (Notable works) 
  – aufgeführt am Theater Dortmund
  – Uraufführung am Theater Dortmund
  – world premiere at Schauspielhaus Bochum; invited to K15-Festival
  – Institut für Kultur- und Medienmanagement, Hochschule für Musik- und Theater Hamburg
 
  – world premier on AIDAblu in July 2015

Awards 
 Special Award for best play at 7. Dortmunder Literaturwettbewerb (2002) for Erzähler oder Konstruktive Kritik

References

External links 
 Official Website
 Official Youtubechannel

German theatre directors
German contemporary artists
1984 births
Living people